Carl Plaskett (born September 23, 1943) is a sprinter who represents the United States Virgin Islands. He competed in the men's 200 metres at the 1968 Summer Olympics.

References

1943 births
Living people
Athletes (track and field) at the 1968 Summer Olympics
United States Virgin Islands male sprinters
Olympic track and field athletes of the United States Virgin Islands
Competitors at the 1966 Central American and Caribbean Games
Athletes (track and field) at the 1967 Pan American Games
Central American and Caribbean Games silver medalists for the United States Virgin Islands
Central American and Caribbean Games bronze medalists for the United States Virgin Islands
Place of birth missing (living people)
Central American and Caribbean Games medalists in athletics
Pan American Games competitors for the United States Virgin Islands